Holttumochloa is a genus of Malaysian bamboos in the grass family native to the hill forests of Peninsular Malaysia. It is sometimes included in the genus Bambusa.

The genus name of Holttumochloa is in honour of Richard Eric Holttum (1895–1990), who was an English botanist and author.

Species
 Holttumochloa korbuensis  K.M.Wong - Perak
 Holttumochloa magica (Ridl.) K.M.Wong - Pahang
 Holttumochloa pubescens K.M.Wong - Kelantan

References

Bambusoideae
Bambusoideae genera
Flora of Peninsular Malaysia